Anne de Deyster (died 1747) was an artist from Bruges, specialised in history painting. She was trained by her father, Louis de Deyster, whose biography she wrote. She died on 14 December 1747.

References

1747 deaths
Artists from Bruges
18th-century Flemish painters